Tidalis is a tile-matching video game developed and published by Arcen Games.

References

External links
Official site

2010 video games
Linux games
MacOS games
Video games developed in the United States
Windows games
Falling block puzzle games